PESA Tramicus 120N is a tram produced by a Polish company PESA in Bydgoszcz. The tram has a modern, fully low-floor design.

They are currently used by Warsaw Tramway in Warsaw and operate on the line 9. Currently 15 trams 120N are in service in Warsaw. In 2009, a newer model of the tram, called 120Na was ordered by Warsaw in quantity of 186. These were delivered between 2010–2013.

Production

External links
 Technical data from the producer

Tram vehicles of Poland
PESA trams